Fan Yuanlian (1875 – 23 December 1927), courtesy name Jingsheng, was a Chinese educator and politician who served three separate terms as minister of Education of the Republic of China, from July 1912 to July 1913 and from July 1915 to November 1917, and briefly from August 1920 to December 1921. He also served as president of Tsinghua University from January 1918 to April 1918 and president of Beijing Normal University between July 1923 and September 1924. He was the founding father of Nankai University.

Biography
Fan was born in Xiangyin County, Hunan in 1875, during the late Qing dynasty. He had a younger brother named Fan Xudong (1883-1945). He attended the Qingquan School.  After graduating from the School of Current Affairs in Changsha in 1898, he moved to Japan to commence graduate studies, where he studied at Datong School, Tokyo Normal College, Hongwen Academy, and Hosei University.

Fan returned China in 1904 and one year later he founded Tsinghua School with other educators in Beijing. He established the Zhibian School in Beijing in 1909.

After establishment of the Republic of China in 1912, he was appointed vice-minister of Education in Tang Shaoyi's cabinet. In July of that same year, he succeeded Zhao Bingjun as the minister. He resigned in July 1913 and relocated to Shanghai as chief editor of Zhong Hua Book Company.

In the winner of 1915, he participated in the Anti-Yuan Shikai Movement. In July, he was named vice-minister of Education in Duan Qirui's cabinet. He put Cai Yuanpei forward as president of Tsinghua University. Fan concurrently served as minister of Internal Affairs between January 1917 and July 1917. In November 1917, he went to the United States on a countryside education investigation. In 1919 he founded Nankai University with Zhang Boling in Tianjin. In August 1920 he was appointed Ministry of Education, but having held the position for only three months. Then he went to the United States again and did a countryside education investigation. In July 1923, Beijing National Higher Normal School was renamed Beijing Normal University, Fan was unanimously chosen as its first president.

On December 23, 1927, he died of illness in Tianjin.

References

External links

1875 births
People from Xiangyin County
1927 deaths
Hosei University alumni
Educators from Hunan
Republic of China politicians from Hunan
Presidents of Tsinghua University